Phatutshedzo “Shaun” Maswanganyi (born 1 February 2001) is a South African track and field athlete.

Personal life
Born in Soweto, he attended St Alban’s College in Pretoria and  he is now an attendee at the University of Houston.

Career
At the 2019 African U18 and U20 Championships in Athletics held in Abidjan, Ivory Coast, he won the silver medal in the 100 metres and the gold medal in the 200 metres.  He’s the current South African 60m Indoor U20 National Record holder (6.65) and current South African U20 National 100m record holder (10.06). In The American Outdoor Track & Field Championships, Maswanganyi ran the 100m in 9.87 seconds which would have been a new South African senior record had it not been wind assisted. He won gold in the 200m running a wind assisted 19.93 seconds. On 31 May 2021 he secured a double qualification for both the 100m and 200m events for the delayed 2020 Tokyo Olympics.

References

External links

 (Track & Field Results Reporting System)
 Houston Cougars bio

2001 births
Living people
South African male sprinters
Houston Cougars men's track and field athletes
Sportspeople from Soweto
Athletes (track and field) at the 2020 Summer Olympics
Olympic athletes of South Africa
21st-century South African people